The Munn Park Historic District is a U.S. historic district (designated as such on November 3, 1997) located in Lakeland, Florida. It is named in honor of the city's founder, Abraham Munn. The district is bounded by East Bay Street, North Florida Avenue, East Orange Street, and East Main Street. It contains 48 historic buildings and 1 object.

The central feature of the district is Munn Park. On June 3, 1910, the Daughters of the Confederacy erected a Confederate monument in the center of the park. It was removed March 22, 2019.

Gallery

References

2.  Yesterday's Lakeland, 1976

External links

 Polk County listings at National Register of Historic Places

Lakeland, Florida
National Register of Historic Places in Polk County, Florida
Historic districts on the National Register of Historic Places in Florida